Tanja Miletić Oručević (born 6 February 1970) is a Bosnian theatre director, academic lecturer, and translator.

Life and career
She was born in 1970 in Sarajevo and has graduated in 1999 from the drama directing department of the Ludwig Solski State Theatre School in Cracow. She has directed more than 30 professional theatre performances in theatres of Bosnia and Herzegovina, Macedonia, Poland, Italy and the Czech Republic. She was the co-founder of the Independent Theatre Studio Laznia in Cracow. Some of her first projects were performances produced at Laznia: Jean Genet's “Maids” and Slobodan Šnajder's “Snaks's Skin”. Tanja has been a Mostar Youth Theatre director since the summer of 2012. 

Tanja is one of the co-founders of the Acting Department at the Dzemal Bijedic University's Faculty of Humanities in Mostar. She has been lecturing and teaching drama (acting, dramaturgy) in Bosnia and Herzegovina since 2000. Starting in 2007, as a Ph.D. student at JAMU in Brno, she has been working on international drama teaching programs (Erasmus and others).  

Besides her native language, she speaks English, Polish, and Czech and has translated drama works from these languages. She has also published an anthology of contemporary Polish drama called "Mortal kombajn" in Sarajevo.

Noted works
 Jean Genet's "Maids", Laznia Krakow
 Slobodan Šnajder "Snake's Skin" Laznia Krakow
 Mark Ravenhill "Shopping & F***ing", MESS Sarajevo
 Sarah Kane "Cleansed" MESS Sarajevo
 Feral Tribune Cabaret, Putujući teatar Hasije Borić, Sarajevo
 Damir Šodan" Night of..." Mostar Youth Theatre Mostar
 Maksim Gorkij "Lower depths" Bosnian National Theatre Zenica
 Irfan Horozović "Garden with fountain", Festival Dionysia Rome
 Almir Bašović "Re: Pinocchio", CTC Skopje
 Glassraum (The Glass Horizon), JAMU Brno and PQ+ Prague Quadrienalle international project

References

1970 births
Living people
21st-century translators
Bosnia and Herzegovina theatre directors
People from Mostar
Czech–Bosnian translators
English–Bosnian translators
Polish–Bosnian translators
Theatre people from Sarajevo
Bosnia and Herzegovina translators